The Luzon flameback (Chrysocolaptes haematribon) is a species of bird in the family Picidae. It is found on the northern islands of Luzon, Polillo, Catanduanes and Marinduque, Philippines.  It is sometimes considered a subspecies of the greater flameback.

Habitat 

Its natural habitats are tropical moist lowland forests and less often on tropical moist montane forests up to 1,500 masl. It is threatened by habitat loss, and the illegal wildlife trade. It is possibly extinct on Marinduque

Description 
Large sized woodpecker with a red back hence the name and a yellowish belly. Males and females are sexually dimorphic. Males have a red crest while the females have a more drab black crest with white spots.

References

Collar, N.J. 2011. Species limits in some Philippine birds including the Greater Flameback Chrysocolaptes lucidus. Forktail number 27: 29–38.

Luzon flameback
Birds of Luzon
Fauna of Catanduanes
Fauna of Marinduque
Luzon flameback